Cinema for Peace Awards are prizes awarded by the Cinema for Peace Foundation, a Berlin-based initiative that claims to raise awareness for the social relevance of films. Since 2002, Cinema for Peace has been inviting film makers, humanitarian and human rights activists, and public figures to its annual awards ceremony in Berlin to honor a selection of cinematic works on humanitarian and environmental issues. The event occurs at the same time as (but not as part of) the Berlin International Film Festival.

History 
Following the September 11 attacks in 2001, Jaka Bizilj launched the Cinema for Peace initiative with the annual gala as a platform for communicating humanitarian, political and social issues through the medium of film. Bob Geldof described the awards gala as "the Oscars with brains".

Activities 
Cinema for Peace as global initiative regularly acts in many countries. Cinema for Peace screenings, campaigns, advocacy events, and galas have been taking place for example at the Filmfestival in Cannes, in Los Angeles on the occasions of the Golden Globes  and on Oscar weekend, in Uganda at the conference of the International Criminal Court, and in Berlin, where Cinema for Peace annually highlights the most valuable films of the year at the Cinema for Peace Gala.

The Cinema for Peace Foundation organizes various monthly screenings, mainly through partnering cinemas, such as the Schikaneder in Vienna 

Cinema for Peace distributed the Bosnian Oscar-winning war satire No Man's Land by Danis Tanovic.
In 2014, Jaka Bizilj as the Founder of Cinema for Peace invited Pussy Riot to the Olympic Games in Sochi and brought them to Hollywood and to Washington in order to promote global human rights responsibility and advocate a global Sanction List for human rights offenders.

Committee and supporters 

Among the Cinema for Peace speakers have been: Buzz Aldrin, Antonio Banderas, Deepak Chopra, George Clooney, Catherine Deneuve, Leonardo DiCaprio, Bob Geldof, Richard Gere, Dustin Hoffman, Elton John, Nicole Kidman, Sir Christopher Lee, Sean Penn, Tim Robbins, Susan Sarandon, Hilary Swank, Wim Wenders, Ban Ki-Moon, Luis Moreno-Ocampo and Fatou Bensouda as well as Mikhail Gorbachev.

Award winners

2002
 Honorary Award: Istvàn Szabo, for portraying the Jewish struggle for survival after WWII

2003
 The Cinema for Peace Award for The Most Valuable Film of the Year: Danis Tanovic for No Man's Land

2004
 The Cinema for Peace Award for The Most Valuable Film of the Year: John Boorman and Robert Chartoff for In My Country (based on the autobiographical memoir Country of My Skull)
 Honorary Award: Lars von Trier

2005
 The Cinema for Peace Award for The Most Valuable Film of the Year: Terry George, Alex Kitman Ho, Sam Bhembe, Roberto Cicutto and Don Cheadle for Hotel Rwanda

2006
 The Cinema for Peace Award for The Most Valuable Film of the Year: George Clooney and Grant Heslov for Good Night, and Good Luck
 The Most Valuable Work of a Director, Producer or Screenwriter: David Yates and Richard Curtis for The Girl in the Café
 Honorary Award: Michael Winterbottom

2007
 The Cinema for Peace Award for The Most Valuable Film of the Year: Clint Eastwood for Flags of our Fathers and Letters from Iwo Jima
 The Most Valuable Film Director: Bille August for Goodbye Bafana
 The Most Valuable Film Actor: Forest Whitaker in The Last King of Scotland
 Pioneer Award: Bob Geldof
 The International Human Rights Film Award: Coca – The Dove from Chechnya and Eric Bergkraut
 Brehm & V. Moers Talent Grant: I Don't Feel Like Dancing

2008
 The Cinema for Peace Award for The Most Valuable Film of the Year: Persepolis, by Vincent Paronnaud and Marjane Satrapi
 The Cinema for Peace Award for The Most Valuable Documentary of the Year: Trouble - Teatime in Heiligendamm by Ralf Schmerberg and Dropping Knowledge
 Most Valuable Work of Director, Producer or Screenwriter: Juno and Jason Reitman, Diablo Cody, John Malkovich, Mason Novick, Russel Smith and Lianne Halfon
 Best Short Film: The Spirit by Joseph Fiennes
 The International Human Rights Film Award: Malalai Joya for Enemies of Happiness
 Clean Energy Award: Earth by Alix Tidmarsh, Sophokles Tasioulis, Alastair Fothergill, Mark Linfield, Nikolaus Weil and Stefan Beiten 
 Honorary Award: Ben Kingsley for portraying Simon Wiesenthal, Itzhak Stern in Schindler's List, and Mahatma Gandhi
 Special Award: the makers of The Experimental Witch, initiated by Paolo Coelho and created with the original work of 14 filmmakers from around the world.

2009
 The Cinema for Peace Award for The Most Valuable Film of the Year: Milk by Gus Van Sant, Bruce Cohen, Dan Jinks, Dustin Lance Black, Michael London and Sean Penn
 The Cinema for Peace Award for The Most Valuable Documentary of the Year: The Heart of Jenin by Ismael Khatib, Leon Geller, Marcus Vetter
 The Cinema for Peace Award for Justice: Pray the Devil Back to Hell by Gini Reticker, Abigail Disney, Vaiba Flomo
 The International Human Rights Film Award: Burma VJ – Reporting form a Closed Country by Anders Østergaard, Lise Lense-Møller, Aung Htun and The Democratic Voice of Burma 
 The Most Inspirational Movie: The Day After Peace by Jeremy Gilley & Peace One Day; Menachem and Fred by Menachem Mayer, Fred Raymes, Jens Meurer, Ofra Tevet and Ronit Kertsner; and Valkyrie by Tom Cruise, Bill Nighy, Christian Berkel, Matthias Schweighöfer, Bryan Singer and Philipp von Schulthess
 Contribution to the UN millennium development goals: 8 by Jane Campion, Gael Garcìa Bernal, Jan Kounen, Mira Nair, Gaspar Noé, Abderrahmane Sissako, Gus van Sant and Wim Wenders
 The International Green Film Award: Leonardo DiCaprio
 Honorary Award: Roger Waters

2010
 The Cinema for Peace Award for The Most Valuable Film of the Year: The White Ribbon by Michael Haneke
 The Cinema for Peace Award for The Most Valuable Documentary of the Year: The Picture of the Napalm Girl by Marc Wiese, Nick Út and Kim Phúc
 The Cinema for Peace Award for Justice (presented by Luis Moreno-Ocampo): Children of War by Bryan Single; The Stoning of Soraya M. by Cyrus Nowrasteh; Women in Shroud by Mohammad Reza Kazemi and Farid Haerinejad
 Most Valuable Work of a Director, Actor, Producer: Triage and Danis Tanovic, Cedomir Kolar, Colin Farrell and Christopher Lee
 The International Human Rights Film Award: Tibet in Song and Ngawang Choephel
 Award for Reconciliation: Five Minutes of Heaven and Oliver Hirschbiegel, Liam Neeson and James Nesbitt
 The International Green Film Award (presented by Mikhail Gorbachev and Leonardo DiCaprio): Crude by Joe Berlinger
 Honorary Award: As We Forgive and Laura Waters Hinson and Paul Kagame

2011
 The Cinema for Peace Award for The Most Valuable Film of the Year: Of Gods and Men
 The Cinema for Peace Award for The Most Valuable Documentary of the Year: Skateistan – Four Wheels and a Board in Kabul 
 The Cinema for Peace Award for Justice: Blood in the Mobile 
 The International Human Rights Film Award: Marco Arana Zegarra in The Devil Operation 
 The International Green Film Award: Jane's Journey; A Message from Pandora; Harmony 
 Honorary Award: Sean Penn for his aid work with the J/P Haitian Relief Organization
 Award for Fighting AIDS: Bill Roedy for the "Staying Alive" campaign, the "Ignite" campaign and Shuga

2012
 The Cinema for Peace Award for The Most Valuable Film of the Year: In the Land of Blood and Honey 
 The Cinema for Peace Award for The Most Valuable Documentary of the Year: Paradise Lost 3: Purgatory (West Memphis Three)
 The Cinema for Peace Award for Justice: Justice for Sergei on Sergei Magnitsky; Granito: How to Nail a Dictator
 The International Human Rights Film Award: The Lady and Aung San Suu Kyi
 The International Green Film Award: Burning in the Sun
 Honorary Award: Angelina Jolie and cast for In the Land of Blood and Honey

2013
 The Cinema for Peace Award for The Most Valuable Film of the Year: Lincoln 
 The Cinema for Peace Award for The Most Valuable Documentary of the Year: Searching for Sugar Man; The Gatekeepers 
 The Cinema for Peace Award for Justice: No; Class Dismissed on Malala Yousafzai
 The International Human Rights Film Award: Call Me Kuchu, David Kato and Frank Mugisha 
 The International Green Film Award: Bitter Seeds
 Honorary Award: Nicole Kidman for her work with UN Women
 Award for Opposing Antisemitism: Veronica Ferres, Marga Spiegel and Charlotte Knobloch

2014 
 The Cinema for Peace Award for The Most Valuable Film of the Year: 12 Years a Slave, directed by Steve McQueen.
 The Cinema for Peace Award for The Most Valuable Documentary of the Year: Alias Ruby Blade by Alex Meillier; Children on the Frontline by Marcel Mettelsiefen and Anthony Wonke; Dirty Wars by Rick Rowley; Everyday Rebellion by Arash Riahi and Arman Riahi; Ground Zero: Syria by Robert King; Pussy Riot: A Punk Prayer by Mike Lerner and Maxim Pozdorovkin; Recycling Medea by Asteris Kutulas; The Family by Stefan Weinert; The Kill Team by Dan Krauss; The Missing Picture by Rithy Panh; The Square by Jehane Noujaim.
 The Cinema for Peace Award for Justice: #chicagoGirl: The Social Network Takes on a Dictator by Joe Piscatella.
 The International Green Film Award: Big Men by Rachel Boynton.
 Honorary Award: Nelson Mandela; the makers of Mandela: Long Walk to Freedom; Christopher Lee.

2015

 The Cinema for Peace Award for The Most Valuable Film of the Year: Selma by Ava DuVernay, Unbroken by Angelina Jolie and Timbuktu by Abderrahmane Sissako.
 The Cinema for Peace Award for The Most Valuable Documentary of the Year: Drone by Tonje Hessen Schei and E-Team by Katy Chevigny and Ross Kauffman.
 The Cinema for Peace Award for Justice: Three Windows and a Hanging by Isa Qosja and Miners Shot Down by Rehad Desai.
 The International Green Film Award: Virunga by Orlando von Einsiedel.
 Special Award: Til Schweiger and Honey in the Head; Ennio Morricone.
 Honorary Award: Ai Weiwei.

2016

 The Cinema for Peace Award for The Most Valuable Film of the Year: Beasts of No Nation by Cary Fukunaga
 The Cinema for Peace Award for The Most Valuable Documentary of the Year: Cartel Land by Matthew Heineman
 The Cinema for Peace Award for Justice: Watchers of the Sky by Edet Belzberg
 The International Green Film Award: Racing Extinction by Louie Psihoyos
 Special Award for The Most Valuable Film on Refugees: A Syrian Love Story by Sean McAllister

2017 

 The Cinema for Peace Award for The Most Valuable Film of the Year: Hacksaw Ridge by Mel Gibson
 The Cinema for Peace Award for The Most Valuable Documentary of the Year: Keep Quiet by Sam Blair and Joseph Martin, Disturbing the Peace by Stephen Apko and Andrew Young, Tickling Giants by Sara Taksler, Peshmerga by Bernard-Henri Lévy, The White Helmets by Orlando von Einsiedel and When God Sleeps by Till Schauder.
 The Cinema for Peace Award for Justice: Snowden by Oliver Stone
 The International Green Film Award: The Ivory Game by Kief Davidson and Richard Ladkani

2018 

 The Cinema for Peace Award for The Most Valuable Film of the Year: The Post by Steven Spielberg
 The Cinema for Peace Award for The Most Valuable Documentary of the Year: Cries from Syria by Evgeny Afineevsky
 The Cinema for Peace Award for Justice: The Breadwinner by Nora Twomey
 The International Green Film Award: Jane by Brett Morgen

2019 

 The Cinema for Peace Award for The Most Valuable Film of the Year: Capernaum by Nadine Labaki
 The Cinema for Peace Award for The Most Valuable Documentary of the Year: The Heart of Nuba by Kenneth Carlson
 The Cinema for Peace Award for Women's Empowerment: RBG by Betsy West, Julie Cohenhe Cinema for Peace Award for The Political Film of the Year
 The Cinema for Peace Award for Political Film of the Year: Watergate by Charles Ferguson
 The Cinema for Peace Award for Justice: Two Catalonias by Gerardo Olivares, Álvaro Longoria
 The International Green Film Award: The Elephant Queen by Mark Deeble, Victoria Stone

2020 

 The Cinema for Peace Award for The Most Valuable Film of the Year: 1917 by Sam Mendes
 The Cinema for Peace Award for The Most Valuable Documentary of the Year: The Cave by Feras Fayyad
 The Cinema for Peace Award for Women's Empowerment: A Girl from Mogadishu by Mary McGuckian; Maiden by Alex Holmes
 The Cinema for Peace Award for Political Film of the Year: The Report by Scott Z. Burns; Official Secrets by Gavin Hood
 The Cinema for Peace Award for Justice: The Collini Case by Marco Kreuzpainter; A Regular Woman (Nur eine Frau) by Sherry Hormann
 The International Green Film Award: Sanctuary by Álvaro Longoria; Sea of Shadows by Richard Ladkani
 Honorary Award: Crescendo by Dror Zahavi; Costa-Gavras; Vanessa Redgrave; Gerard Butler

2021 

 The Cinema for Peace Dove for The Most Valuable Film of the Year: Quo Vadis, Aida? by Jasmila Žbanić
 The Cinema for Peace Dove for The Most Valuable Documentary of the Year: Welcome to Chechnya by David France; The Mole: Undercover in North Korea by Mads Brügger
 The Cinema for Peace Dove for Women’s Empowerment: Nasrin by Jeff Kaufman
 The Cinema for Peace Dove for The Political Film of the Year:  Mayor by David Osit 
 The Cinema for Peace Dove for Justice: The Dissident  by Bryan Fogel
 The International Green Film Award: David Attenborough: A Life on Our Planet by Alastair Fothergill, Jonathan Hughes and Keith Scholey
 The Cinema for Peace Dove on Global Health: Coronation by Weiwei Ai

2022 

 The Cinema for Peace Dove for The Most Valuable Film of the Year: CODA by Sian Heder
 The Cinema for Peace Dove for The Most Valuable Documentary of the Year: Flee by Jonas Poher Rasmussen
 The Cinema for Peace Dove  for Women’s Empowerment: Writing with Fire by Rintu Thomas and Sushmit Ghosh
 The Cinema for Peace Dove for The Political Film of the Year: Not Going Quietly by Nicholas Bruckman; Courage by Aliaksei Paluyan; The Caviar Connection by Benoit Bringer
 The Cinema for Peace Dove for Justice: Navalny by Daniel Roher 
 The International Green Film Award: Milked by Amy Taylor
 The Cinema for Peace Dove on Global Health: Introducing, Selma Blair by Rachel Fleit

2023

The Cinema for Peace Dove for The Most Valuable Film of the Year: All Quiet on the Western Front by Edward Berger
 The Cinema for Peace Dove for The Most Valuable Documentary of the Year: 20 Days in Mariupol by Mstyslav Chernov
 The Cinema for Peace Dove  for Women’s Empowerment: She Said by Maria Schrader
 The Cinema for Peace Dove for The Political Film of the Year: The Corridors of Power by Dror Moreh
 The Cinema for Peace Dove for Justice: Argentina, 1985 by Santiago Mitre 
 The International Green Film Award: All That Breathes by Shaunak Sen; The Territory by Alex Pritz
 The Cinema for Peace Dove on Global Health: How to Survive a Pandemic by David France

References

External links
 

Film organizations in the United States